The Calumet Hotel in Wasta, South Dakota, United States—also known as Wasta Hotel or the Wasta Hotel and Meat Market—was built in 1908.  It was expanded in 1920 and 1922.  It was listed on the National Register of Historic Places in 2000.

By 1999 it had had seven owners, and it had served as a restaurant, as a boarding house, as a meeting place, as a meat market, and as a hotel. After it ceased operation as a hotel it was still used as a vacation home for annual family reunions held in Wasta.  It is the largest building in Wasta's former business district.

References

Buildings and structures in Pennington County, South Dakota
Hotel buildings completed in 1908
Hotels established in 1908
Hotel buildings on the National Register of Historic Places in South Dakota
1908 establishments in South Dakota
National Register of Historic Places in Pennington County, South Dakota